Zuyevo is a rural locality (a village) in Beketovskoye Rural Settlement, Vozhegodsky District, Vologda Oblast, Russia. The population was 16 as of 2002.

Geography 
Zuyevo is located 78 km southwest of Vozhega (the district's administrative centre) by road. Pokrovskaya is the nearest rural locality.

References 

Rural localities in Vozhegodsky District